Capitu is a Brazilian television series written by Euclydes Marinho, directed by Luiz Fernando Carvalho, who also finalized the script, and presented by Rede Globo between 8 and 13 December 2008. The production was a homage to the centennial anniversary of the death of Machado de Assis, author of the 1899 novel Dom Casmurro, on which the miniseries was based. Capitu is the main female character of that novel, and is the object of Bentinho's (Dom Casmurro) obsession. The novel forces the reader to decide if Capitu cheated or not on Bentinho.

Production
The mini-series was written by Euclydes Marinho in collaboration with Daniel Piza, Luis Alberto de Abreu and Edna Palatnik, and has the script finalized by Luiz Fernando Carvalho. Art direction by Raimundo Rodriguez, photography by Adrian Teijido and costumes by Beth Filipecki. Colorist Sergio Pasqualino. It marked the TV debut of actors Letícia Persiles and Michel Melamed, among others. The mini-series was filmed in the abandoned Automóvel Clube building, in downtown Rio de Janeiro, and the whole scenographic universe was created from newspaper and recycled material. The opening credits scene was conceived by the director and created by the designer Carlos Bêla. The production is part of the Quadrante Project and was the director's tribute to Machado de Assis on the centenary of his death.

Cast

The Children

Special guests

Reception

Critical response 
In the opinion of critic Gustavo Bernardo, the mini-series deserves "to be viewed and reviewed countless times, at least because each fragment of a scene is precious for its beauty". According to theatre director Gabriel Villela, Luiz Fernando Carvalho produces works of art on the screen, calls on the viewer's vivacity so that he accepts nothing masticated, but masticates along with Casmurro. For Randall Johnson, director of the UCLA Latin American Institute, "Luiz Fernando Carvalho is today, without doubt, the director whose work is the most authorial of all TV and cinema production in Brazil".

Accolades  
It received the APCA (Associação Paulista de Críticos de Arte) Critic's Choice Award (2009), ABC Best Photography Award  (from the Associação Brasileira de Cinematografia) and the Creative Review award in the Best in Book and Design and Art Director categories.

Bibliography
 
 
 
 Carter, Eli Lee "Rereading Dom Casmurro - aesthetic hybridity in Capitu", University of Virginia, 2014.

References

External links
 Luiz Fernando Carvalho - Official website 
 Capitu on Memoria Globo
 

Rede Globo original programming
2008 Brazilian television series debuts
2008 Brazilian television series endings
Brazilian drama television series
Television series created by Luiz Fernando Carvalho